Sokolovsky is a rural locality (a khutor) in Nikolskoye Rural Settlement, Bobrovsky District, Voronezh Oblast, Russia. The population was 110 as of 2010.

Geography 
Sokolovsky is located 21 km southwest of Bobrov (the district's administrative centre) by road. Peskovatka is the nearest rural locality.

References 

Rural localities in Bobrovsky District